Rhêmes-Notre-Dame is a town and comune in the Aosta Valley region of north-west Italy.

Geography

Rhemes-Notre-Dame is a mountain village located in the upper Rhêmes valley. It is part of Gran Paradiso National Park. It is surrounded by mountains and glaciers. Despite the presence of some hotels and downhill slopes it still is a natural place with a rural architectural structure.

Climate
Because of its altitude, winters are cold and snowy, while summers are fresh. Temperatures vary from a minimum value of  during winters to a maximum value of  during summers.

Economy
The economy of Rhêmes-Notre-Dame is based on skiing during winters and mountain biking and excursions during summers. However, there still are some agricultural activities like cattle breeding that characterized the past of this place.

Twin towns — sister cities
Rhêmes-Notre-Dame is twinned with:

  Solarolo, Italy, since 1999

References

See also 
 Mont Tout Blanc

Cities and towns in Aosta Valley